Active Guard Reserve (AGR) refers to a United States Army and United States Air Force federal military program which places Army National Guard and Army Reserve soldiers and Air National Guard and Air Force Reserve airmen on federal active duty status under Title 10 U.S.C., or full-time National Guard duty under Title 32 U.S.C. 502(f) for a period of 180 consecutive days or greater in order to provide full-time support to National Guard and Reserve organizations for the purpose of leading, organizing, administering, recruiting, instructing, or training the Reserve Components according to Subsection 101(d)(6).

History
Since September 11, 2001, substantial numbers of AGRs have been placed on active duty for direct support of the Active Component (also known as the Regular Component) of the armed forces in order to fill critical shortfall requirements for which no qualified Active Component fill is available.  Most often, these are general officers and field grade officers in the commissioned officer ranks and senior non-commissioned officers in the enlisted ranks, typically assigned to the Joint Staff, the Army Staff, the Air Staff, or the combatant commands.

Soldiers and Airmen in such status are commonly referred to as AGRs. Although they continue to be members of the Reserve Components, they are in a different federal status than traditional part-time Army Reserve Component or Air Reserve Component members (including full-time Army Reserve Technician and Air Reserve Technician Program members) called to active duty for training, special work, operational support to the Active Component, or mobilized for contingency operations.  

Certain units with critical stateside missions, such as the National Guard Bureau, the 1st Air Force, the Eastern Air Defense Sector, Western Air Defense Sector, and the 176th Air Defense Squadron, have been converted from regular active duty personnel to "all AGR" in order to provide more consistent manning.

Navy Reserve, Marine Corps Reserve, and Coast Guard Reserve counterparts

The sea services (i.e., United States Navy, United States Marine Corps, and United States Coast Guard) do not have an AGR program per se, but do have cadres of full-time active duty personnel in support of the respective Reserve Components and integrated with the Active Component.

U.S. Navy Reserve Full-Time Support (FTS) officers and sailors, formerly known as Training and Administration of the Reserves (TAR), U.S. Marine Corps Active Reserve (AR), and U.S. Coast Guard Reserve Program Administrators (RPAs) are technically included in the definition of AGR.  But whereas Army and Air Force Reserve Component personnel can enter the AGR program at any point in their careers, entry into the sea service programs is typically limited to E-5 and below for enlisted personnel and O-4 with less than three years time in grade and below for commissioned officers.  

Approximately 95% of Navy FTS, Marine Corps AR and Coast Guard RPA officers and enlisted personnel enter these programs directly from the Active Component.  Unlike the Army and Air Force AGR programs, the FTS, AR and RPA career tracks are considered permanent active duty career programs, with no opportunity for senior enlisted or senior officers to enter later in their careers from "traditional" part-time Reserve status at the E-7/E-8/E-9, O-5/O-6, or General Officer/Flag Officer levels.  Senior officers in FTS, AR and RPA are also subject to continuation boards at the O-5 and O-6 level and may be subject to an earlier mandated retirement date than their Regular Navy, Regular Marine Corps or Regular Coast Guard counterparts of the same pay grade in the Active Component or their Traditional Reserve/Selected Reserve counterparts in the Reserve Component, including the latter when recalled back to active duty.  

Since September 11, 2001, "traditional" Reserve officers of the Navy, Marine Corps and Coast Guard above the rank of O-4 and senior enlisted at E-6 and above have been recalled to active duty for successive back-to-back or near back-to-back active duty periods under mobilization, special work or operational support orders, filling shortfalls for two, three, four, or more years for which no qualified Active Component or FTS officer or senior enlisted is available, or individuals in the Reserve Component with specific talents and/or experience for whom the Active Component senior leadership (typically at the flag officer / general officer level) has made a "by name" request.  However, career tenure (other than for Reserve retirement) and an active duty retirement, while occasionally achieved by these personnel, are not guaranteed.  

Navy Reserve Canvasser/Recruiters are also included in the AGR definition, but may be accessed at the E-7/8/9, W-2/3/4/5, O-4 with more than 3 years time in grade, and O-5 pay grades.  Unlike FTS, Canvasser/Recruiter is not considered a career program, so career tenure protections and an active duty retirement are not guaranteed.

See also
 Individual Ready Reserve or IRR

Notes

United States Army National Guard
United States Air National Guard